Tia Alkerdi is a Syrian model of Kurdish origin, she is Miss Syria and the Arabs. She was born in 1997 in the city of Aleppo in Syria.

Pageantry 
Her first appearance in the field of fashion show and beauty contests was in 2017 in Lebanon, and she won the Miss Arab title at the ceremony held by the “Beirut Golden” Foundation and the “Lions” Club in Lebanon, at the festival held at the Jordan Hill Hotel, to elect and choose Miss Arabs and Europe. After that, she was crowned Miss Syria Elegance 2018.

She represented the first appearance of her country, Syria, at Miss Earth competition in 2020.

Activism 
Tiya joined the Ishtar feminist group and became involved in the issue of the Syrian woman, to provide aid and assistance to thousands of women affected by the Syrian war, and to polish the beauty of the figure with the beauty of thought.

References 

1997 births
Living people
Miss Earth 2020 contestants
Syrian models
People from Aleppo